John Shairp may refer to:
 John Shairp (lawyer), Scottish lawyer and businessman
 John Campbell Shairp, Scottish critic and man of letters

See also
 John Sharp (disambiguation)